Police collaboration in Vichy France was part of the Vichy government's external political objectives and emerged as an essential tool of collaboration in meeting its policy of collaboration with Nazi Germany during World War II.

Oath of state
On 14 August 1941, a decree signed by Philippe Pétain required all civil servants to take an oath of loyalty to him. An official ceremony took place for the police on 20 January 1942, during which 3,000 delegates from the Paris Guard, the National Police and the Police Prefecture met in the great hall of the Palais de Chaillot, under the presidency of Pierre Pucheu, Minister of the Interior. After the Peacekeepers' Band played La Marseillaise, the oath was taken in these terms: "I swear loyalty to the Head of State in everything he commands in the interest of the service, public order and the good of the country". To which all the police officers present responded by raising their arms and saying: "I swear it".

See also

 Carlingue
 Collaboration with the Axis powers
 Government of Vichy France
 Green ticket roundup
 Groupe mobile de réserve
 Law on the status of Jews
 Joseph Darnand
 Milice
 René Bousquet
 Special Brigades
 Vel' d'Hiv Roundup
 Vichy anti-Jewish legislation
 Vichy Holocaust collaboration timeline
 Wartime collaboration

References

Citations

Bibliography

 
 
  
 

Vichy France
The Holocaust in France